Air Sial (stylised as AirSial) is a Pakistani airline based in Sialkot, Pakistan. It is the third private airline of Pakistan, inaugurated on Wednesday, 9 December 2020. AirSial has been allowed to operate international flights to UAE, Saudi Arabia, Qatar, Oman, Iraq and Iran.

History 
AirSial was launched to by the Sialkot Chamber of Commerce & Industry to improve air travel to and from the Sialkot region, which is a major industrial city in the state of Punjab. The airline plans to initially serve domestic destinations within Pakistan from their operational hub at Jinnah International Airport, using a fleet of Airbus A320 aircraft, and fly to other major airports within Pakistan. AirSial plans to further expand to destinations within the Middle East at a later date.

Destinations 

AirSial operates flights to the following airports: 

AirSial plans to launch international flights to the United Arab Emirates in march 2023.

Fleet

Current fleet 
The fleet operated by AirSial consists of the following aircraft.

Fleet development 
AirSial has initially signed an agreement to lease three Airbus A320-200 aircraft from AerCap.

In an interview with PlaneSpottersPakistan, Chairman Fazal Jilani discussed the possibility of introducing Airbus A330 aircraft.

On 30 March 2022, AirSial announced an agreement with BOC Aviation for two more Airbus A320-200 aircraft on lease.

Interior
Each Airbus A320 is fitted with a basic 3x3 layout in an all economy configuration, and has 180 seats.

See also
Airblue
SereneAir
Fly Jinnah

References

External links 

Airlines established in 2017
Airlines of Pakistan
Companies based in Sialkot
Pakistani companies established in 2017